Serbia selected their Junior Eurovision Song Contest 2014 entry through an internal selection. On 1 October 2014 it was revealed that Emilija Đonin would represent Serbia in the contest with the song "Svet u mojim očima".

Internal selection
On 1 October 2014, it was revealed that the Serbian teen singer Emilija Đonin, would represent Serbia with the song "Svet u mojim očima".

At Junior Eurovision 
At the running order draw which took place on 9 November 2014, Serbia were drawn to perform fourteenth on 15 November 2014, following  and preceding host country .

Voting

Detailed voting results
The following members comprised the Serbian jury:
 Slobodan Marković
 Dejan Cukić
 Jelena Tomašević
 Marija Marić Marković
 Ivona Menzalin

Notes

References

Junior Eurovision Song Contest
Serbia
2014